Khe Sanh Combat Base (also known as Ta Con) was a United States Marine Corps outpost south of the Vietnamese Demilitarized Zone (DMZ) used during the Vietnam War.

History
US Army Special Forces (Detachment A-101, Company C, 5th Special Forces Group) constructed a camp with airfield outside the village of Khe Sanh in July 1962. It served as an outpost of the Civilian Irregular Defense Groups. Its purpose was to keep watch on People's Army of Vietnam (PAVN) infiltration along the border and to protect the local population.

In January 1966 the People's Army of Vietnam (PAVN) attacked the camp with 120 mm mortars and intelligence indicated that a PAVN buildup was taking place in the area. In March MACV instructed the III Marine Amphibious Force (III MAF) to plan a one-battalion security operation around the camp. On 27 March 3rd Marine Division commander MG Wood B. Kyle ordered the 4th Marine Regiment at Phu Bai Combat Base to deploy the 1st Battalion, 1st Marines and supporting artillery and mortar batteries to Khe Sanh. 1/1 Marines commander Lt. Col. Van D. Bell flew into Khe Sanh to plan his deployment and found the Special Forces there to be nervous and leaving all patrolling outside the perimeter to Nùng forces. On 3 April the operational order for Operation Virginia was issued, with the operation to begin on 5 April. On 4 April an advance unit was landed at Khe Sanh, but the arrival of the rest of the force was delayed by bad weather and the effects of the Buddhist Uprising and it wasn't until 18 April that VMGR-152 Lockheed Martin KC-130s were able to complete the deployment. The plan called for sequential sweeps to the northeast, northwest and then southwest of the base. On 19 April HMM-163 helicopters landed the headquarters unit and Company C in a blocking position 6 km north of the base and then landed Companies A and B 9 km further east, Companies A and B then swept west meeting no PAVN and joined up with Company C on 21 April and the force then returned to the base. Reconnaissance patrols of the northwest sector indicated no PAVN presence and so the 2nd phase of the operation was cancelled. III MAF then ordered 1/1 Marines to march east along Route 9 which had been closed for several years to determine if there was any PAVN buildup south of the DMZ. The artillery unit was moved to Ca Lu to cover Route 9 and on 1 May the 1/1 Marines completed the  march from the base to Cam Lộ encountering no PAVN. 

In December 1966, Special Forces Detachment A-101 moved from Khe Sanh to a site near the village of Lang Vei,

Fighting began at Khe Sanh in late April 1967 with the hill fights, which later expanded into the 1968 Battle of Khe Sanh. U.S. commanders hoped that the PAVN would attempt to repeat their famous victory at the Battle of Dien Bien Phu, which would permit the U.S. to wield enormous air power. Boeing B-52 Stratofortresses alone dropped more than 75,000 tons of bombs on the PAVN 304th and 325th Divisions encroaching the combat base in trenches.

On April 1, 1968, the U.S. Army's 1st Cavalry Division launched Operation Niagara to break the siege of the base. All three brigades from the 1st Cavalry participated in this vast airmobile operation, along with a Marine armor thrust.

The defense of Khe Sanh commanded international attention and was considered the climactic phase of the Tet Offensive. On July 5, 1968, the combat base was abandoned, the U.S. Army citing the vulnerability of the base to dug-in enemy artillery positions in neutral Laos and the arrival of significant airmobile forces in I Corps (1st Cavalry and 101st Airborne divisions). However, the closure permitted the 3rd Marine Division to conduct mobile operations along the DMZ.

In 1971, Khe Sanh was reactivated by the U.S. Army (Operation Dewey Canyon II) to support Operation Lam Son 719, the South Vietnamese invasion of Laos. On the night of 23 March a PAVN sapper attack on Khe Sanh resulted in 3 Americans killed and several aircraft and 2 ammunition dumps destroyed, PAVN losses were 14 killed and 1 captured. The base was abandoned again on 6 April 1971.

On 27 January 1972 a U.S. Air Force Lockheed AC-130 gunship was shot down by a PAVN SA-2 missile over the base. In March 1973, American intelligence reported that the PAVN had rebuilt the airstrip at Khe Sanh and were using it for courier flights into the South.

Tourism
Khe Sanh Combat Base can be visited daily as part of tours starting in Huế. Since its abandonment, most of the base has become overgrown by wilderness or coffee and banana plants. A small museum on the site contains exhibits of  historical pictures, weapons, and ubiquitous "impression books" common among battlefield and heritage museums in Vietnam. Additionally a C-130, Boeing CH-47 Chinook, Bell UH-1 Iroquois, artillery and armor, restored bunkers and portions of the airstrip are visible.

Gallery

See also
Vietnamese Demilitarized Zone
Khe Sanh

References

Military installations of the United States Marine Corps in South Vietnam
Installations of the United States Army in South Vietnam
Military installations closed in 1971
Military installations established in 1962
1962 establishments in Vietnam
1971 disestablishments in Vietnam
Buildings and structures in Quảng Trị province